Consort Zheng or Empress Zheng may refer to:

Zheng Yingtao (died 349), empress of Shi Hu (Emperor Wu of Later Zhao)
Empress Dowager Zheng (died 865), concubine to Emperor Xianzong of Tang
Empress Zheng (Song dynasty) (1079–1130), wife of Emperor Huizong of Song
Noble Consort Zheng (1565–1630), concubine of the Wanli Emperor